Sodium pertechnetate is the inorganic compound with the formula NaTcO4. This colourless salt contains the pertechnetate anion, . The radioactive  anion is an important radiopharmaceutical for diagnostic use. The advantages to  include its short half-life of 6 hours and the low radiation exposure to the patient, which allow a patient to be injected with activities of more than 30 millicuries.  is a precursor to a variety of derivatives that are used to image different parts of the body.

Chemistry
 is the starting material for most of the chemistry of technetium. Pertechnetate salts are usually colorless.  is produced by oxidizing technetium with nitric acid or with hydrogen peroxide. The pertechnetate anion is similar to the permanganate anion but is a weaker oxidizing agent. It is tetrahedral and diamagnetic. The standard electrode potential for / is only +0.738 V in acidic solution, as compared to +1.695 V for /. Depending on the reducing agent,  can be converted to derivatives containing Tc(VI), Tc(V), and Tc(IV). In the absence of strong complexing ligands,  is reduced to a +4 oxidation state via the formation of  hydrate.

Pharmaceutical use
Radiopharmaceuticals have no intended pharmacologic effect and are used in very low concentrations. Radiopharmaceuticals containing  are currently being applied in the determining morphology of organs, testing of organ function, and scintigraphic and emission tomographic imaging. The gamma radiation emitted by the radionuclide allows organs to be imaged in vivo tomographically.

Specific imaging applications
 is used primarily in the study of the thyroid gland - its morphology, vascularity, and function.  and iodide, due to their comparable charge/radius ratio, are similarly incorporated into the thyroid gland. The pertechnetate ion is not incorporated into the thyroglobulin. It is also used in the study of blood perfusion, regional accumulation, and cerebral lesions in the brain, as it accumulates primarily in the choroid plexus.

Sodium pertechnetate cannot pass through the blood–brain barrier. In addition to the salivary and thyroid glands,  localizes in the stomach.  is renally eliminated for the first three days after being injected. After a scanning is performed, it is recommended that a patient drink large amounts of water in order to expedite elimination of the radionuclide. Other methods of  administration include intraperitoneal, intramuscular, subcutaneous, as well as orally. The behavior of the  ion is essentially the same, with small differences due to the difference in rate of absorption, regardless of the method of administration.

Other reactions involving the pertechnetate ion

Pertechnetate is also reduced to Tc(IV/V) compounds in alkaline solutions in nuclear waste tanks without adding catalytic metals, reducing agents, or external radiation. Reactions of mono- and disaccharides with  yield Tc(IV) compounds that are water-soluble.

References

Pertechnetates
Sodium compounds
Peripherally selective drugs
Technetium-99m